The 1912 Utah gubernatorial election was held on November 5, 1912. Incumbent Republican William Spry defeated Democratic nominee John Franklin Tolton with 38.17% of the vote.

General election

Candidates
Major party candidates
William Spry, Republican 
John Franklin Tolton, Democratic

Other candidates
Nephi L. Morris, Progressive
Homer P. Burt, Socialist
E. A. Battell, Socialist Labor

Results

References

1912
Utah
Gubernatorial